John Scott Bull (born June 8, 1953) is a former professional football player, spending three seasons as a quarterback with the San Francisco 49ers.  He played college football at the University of Arkansas.

In his NFL career, Bull completed 76 of 193 passes for 3 touchdowns. A strong running quarterback, he rushed for 186 yards in 46 attempts and three touchdowns in his three-year professional career.  Bull saw his most extensive action in 1978.  He spent 1979 on injured reserve with a knee injury suffered in the final game of the 1978 season.

References

1953 births
Living people
People from Camden, Arkansas
American football quarterbacks
San Francisco 49ers players
Arkansas Razorbacks football players